Armando Pereira de Basto (26 May 1889 in Porto – 1923 in Minho Province) was a Portuguese painter, illustrator, sculptor and decorator.

Biography 

In 1910, he went to Paris to complete his studies.

In 1914, he was diagnosed with tuberculosis and had to be hospitalized. The following year, he returned home and, in 1916, collaborated on producing the humorous weekly newspaper Miau!, which not only included contributions from his old friends in Paris, now also returned to Portugal, but attracted art work from Théophile Steinlen, Lucien Métivet, Paul Iribe, Francisque Poulbot, Bagaria, Olaf Gulbransson and others outside Portugal as well. He also served as Editor for several long-forgotten humorous journals.

He succumbed to his illness in 1923, after moving to the countryside in search of a better climate.

Selected works

References

Further reading
 Diogo de Macedo, Armando de Basto, 1889-1923, exposição retrospectiva da obra do pintor (exhibition catalog), Secretariado Nacional da Informação, 1958
 Diogo de Macedo, Armando de Basto (Volume 9 of Cadernos de arte), Excelsior, 1952

External links 

 Miau! @ Hemeroteca Digital.
 An appreciation of Basto @ MatrizNet

1889 births
1923 deaths
Portuguese illustrators
Portuguese sculptors
Male sculptors
Artists from Porto
20th-century deaths from tuberculosis
Tuberculosis deaths in Portugal
Portuguese caricaturists
20th-century Portuguese painters
20th-century Portuguese male artists
University of Porto alumni
Portuguese male painters